Vimy Peak is a  summit located in Waterton Lakes National Park, in the Canadian Rockies of Alberta, Canada. It is set along the east shore of Waterton Lake on the opposite side from Waterton Park townsite. It is situated 5.4 km (3.4 mi) west of Sofa Mountain, and the nearest higher neighbor is Arras Peak,  to the southeast. Vimy Peak anchors the northern end of Vimy Ridge, which stretches three kilometers to Arras Peak anchoring the southern end.

History

The mountain was originally labelled as Sheep Mountain on George Dawson's 1886 map. Kootenay Brown referred to it as Goat Mountain. However, in 1917 it was renamed in honor of the Canadian Army's victory at the Battle of Vimy Ridge, to commemorate all who survived and died in the World War I battle. This mountain's name was officially adopted in 1943 by the Geographical Names Board of Canada.

Geology

Like other mountains in Waterton Lakes National Park, Vimy Peak is composed of sedimentary rock laid down during the Precambrian to Jurassic periods. Formed in shallow seas, this sedimentary rock was pushed east and over the top of younger Cretaceous period rock during the Laramide orogeny.

Climate

Based on the Köppen climate classification, Vimy Peak is located in a subarctic climate with cold, snowy winters, and mild summers. Temperatures can drop below −20 °C with wind chill factors below −30 °C. Precipitation runoff from Vimy Peak drains into Waterton Lake,  thence Waterton River.

Gallery

See also

Geography of Alberta

References

External links
 Parks Canada web site: Waterton Lakes National Park
 Vimy Peak weather: Mountain Forecast

Vimy Peak
Vimy Peak
Vimy Peak